Amanda Evora (born November 17, 1984) is an American former competitive pair skater. She competed with Mark Ladwig. They are two-time (2010, 2011) U.S. silver medalists, 2012 U.S. bronze medalists and two-time (2007, 2009) U.S. pewter medalists.

Personal life
Evora was born in New York City. Her family moved to Houston in 1995. Before that, they had lived in Bahrain, Dallas, Texas, and Virginia. She is Filipino American. Her father is a chemical engineer. Evora graduated from the State College of Florida, Manatee–Sarasota and earned a degree in business administration from the University of South Florida.  Amanda married Dustin Will on December 28, 2019.

Career
Evora began skating after she discovered her sister's ice skates and, since they fit, decided to give them a try. When she was 18, she left her family's home in Texas to further her skating career.

Early in her pairs career, Evora skated with Michael Adler. They won the bronze medal at the 2002 Eastern Sectional Championships on the junior level and placed 8th on the junior level at the 2002 United States Figure Skating Championships.

Evora and Ladwig teamed up in 2002. The 2005/2006 season was their first on the Grand Prix. They placed 9th at the 2005 Skate America and 8th at the 2005 Skate Canada International. They were the bronze medalists at the 2007 Nebelhorn Trophy and finished as high as fourth in GP events.

2009–10 was a breakthrough season for Evora and Ladwig. They finished 2nd at the US National Championships, their best finish yet at the event, which led to their selection for the US Olympic team. At the 2010 Vancouver Olympics, they beat their previous personal best by a sizable margin, and finished tenth, making them the top US pair at the Olympics. They later competed at 2010 Worlds for the first time in their career, and finished in ninth place.

Evora served on the 2008–09 Athletes Advisory Committee.

During 2010–2011 season, the pair was assigned to compete at 2010 Cup of China where they finished fifth (151.66 pts) and later earned their first Grand Prix medal, a bronze, at 2010 Cup of Russia, with a season's best of 110.27 and total score of 162.85.

Evora and Ladwig were noted for their longevity as a pair, which is rare in U.S. pair skating. Their partnership ended when Evora retired from competitive skating on April 10, 2012.

In June 2012, Evora was invited by United States Secretary of State Hillary Clinton to attend a luncheon in honor of Benigno S. Aquino III, the President of the Philippines.

In January 2016, Evora returned to the U.S. Nationals as part of the coaching team for Tarah Kayne and Daniel O'Shea  who won the gold medal in the pairs competition.

In 2013, Evora teamed up with Scott Thornton in the Canadian TV show "Battle of the Blades." The duo then went on to win the competition. As of September 2019, Evora has returned to the show and partnered up with Colton Orr.

Programs
(with Ladwig)

Competitive highlights

With Ladwig

With Adler

References

External links

 
 
 
 
 
 

1984 births
Living people
American female pair skaters
American sportspeople of Filipino descent
Olympic figure skaters of the United States
Figure skaters at the 2010 Winter Olympics
Battle of the Blades participants
Sportspeople from New York City
State College of Florida, Manatee–Sarasota alumni
University of South Florida olympians
University of South Florida alumni
21st-century American women
20th-century American women